William Towers , D.D. (20 January 1681– 1 March 1745) was a priest and academic in the eighteenth century.

Towers was born in Gaywood, Norfolk. He was educated at Christ's College, Cambridge, graduating B.A. in 1701 and MA in 1704. He became Fellow of Christ's in 1702; and was Master from 1723 until his death. He was Vice-Chancellor of the University of Cambridge from 1734 to 1735. He held livings at Caldecote and Snailwell. He was Chaplain to King George II from 1727 until 1732.

References 

Alumni of Christ's College, Cambridge
Fellows of Christ's College, Cambridge
Masters of Christ's College, Cambridge
1745 deaths
1681 births
People from King's Lynn
18th-century English Anglican priests
Vice-Chancellors of the University of Cambridge